The 1988–89 Women's Football Association Cup was the nineteenth edition of the WFA Cup (Women's FA Cup), the national women's football knockout competition in England. It was organised by the Women's Football Association (WFA).

The Merseyside club Leasowe Pacific won the trophy in the 1989 WFA Cup Final – the match was played on 22 April, in the aftermath of the Hillsborough disaster the previous week. Three Leasowe players saw the tragedy at close hand, and the women's Final was nearly cancelled.

The WFA Cup finalist clubs were Friends of Fulham, who had been the 1985 Cup-winners, and Leasowe Pacific, the runners-up of the 1988 Final against Doncaster Belles. The 1989 Final had a prominent broadcast on TV with "almost 2 million" viewers.

The 1989 Cup was Leasowe Pacific's only title; the club later became Everton L.F.C.

Early rounds
The 1988 finalists, Leasowe and Doncaster Belles, were drawn together in the 1988–89 quarter-finals. This time, Leasowe defeated Doncaster, the champions of the previous two seasons, who were the strongest team in the women's Cup for many years. This defeat would remain Doncaster Belles' only WFA Cup loss outside of a Final between 1983 and 1994.

In the semi-finals, striker Louise Thomas scored a hat-trick for Leasowe against Nottingham Rangers, in a 3–0 win at Sincil Bank, Lincoln on 5 March. Friends of Fulham played their semi-final against Bronte L.F.C. on the same day at the same venue, a 3–0 win for Fulham.

Hillsborough disaster
One week before the women's Cup Final was scheduled, the Hillsborough disaster caused the deaths of 94 Liverpool fans, ultimately 96, and caused injuries to 766, due to a fatal crush in the crowd at the men's FA Cup semi-final match on Saturday 15 April 1989.

Three of the Leasowe Pacific players were at the Hillsborough match, as regular Liverpool F.C. supporters, in the Leppings Lane End with their team manager's daughter. All four were uninjured. The women's League game the following day between Leasowe and St Helens was cancelled, "as a mark of respect for the Hillsborough victims".

After the traumatic events, Leasowe decided to participate in the women's Cup Final as scheduled, when given the choice of cancelling by the organisers and by Friends of Fulham. The Leasowe manager, Billy Jackson, who had played for the Liverpool junior team, said "I don't know whether we have [made] the right decision or not", adding that the general consensus in discussions favoured going ahead with the game.

At the women's Cup Final on 22 April, a minute's silence was observed and black armbands were worn. The day after the Final, the players of Leasowe laid a memorial wreath on the pitch at Anfield, accompanied by the Fulham team. They were not joined by Leasowe midfielder Cathy Gore, who had been at Hillsborough; Billy Jackson explained, "Cathy told us she could not go to Anfield again."

Final
In the seventh minute, Janice Murray gave Leasowe the lead from a cross by Harper, but Hope Powell equalised a minute later, "with a crisp shot after a good move". Powell's second goal made the score 2–1 for Fulham at half-time, scoring from a "snap volley" that took a "wicked deflection".

In the second half, Fulham goalkeeper Theresa Wiseman saved to prevent goals by Louise Thomas and Maureen Mallon (Mo Marley), but Leasowe levelled the game at 2–2 when Louise Thomas scored after having several chances. Another goal, by Joy McQuiggan, made it 3–2 to Leasowe with fifteen minutes remaining. Friends of Fulham could have equalised again when Marieanne Spacey crossed to Libby Hughes, but Leasowe goalkeeper Stewart made a diving save, which ensured victory for Leasowe Pacific, 3–2.

Four players were singled out for praise in the Liverpool Echo match report:

The match was televised the next day on Channel Four, the first of five successive WFA Cup finals shown by the station. Julie Welch presented a one-hour program at 5:30pm on Sunday 23 April. Although the BBC had shown the WFA Cup before, this game was reportedly "the first to be televised specifically for highlights the following day".

Match details

Note: Louise Thomas is named as scorer explicitly in matchday reports; the second goal has also later been attributed to her team-mate Jill Thomas.

Later developments
The winning goalscorer in the 1989 Final, Joy McQuiggan, went on to play in the 1994 FA Women's Cup Final for Knowsley United (now Liverpool) and played in the 1997 FA Women's Premier League Cup Final for Leasowe's inheritor club, Everton L.F.C.

Hope Powell has had a highly decorated career in football, and later won two Women's FA Cups. Leasowe player Mo Marley, later a FA WPL champion and England player and coach, managed Everton to victory in the 2009–10 FA Women's Cup.

FA historian David Barber said the 1989 match was the only women's football game at Old Trafford until 2012, although England drew 0–0 with Norway in UEFA Women's Euro 1991 qualifying before 435 fans on 2 September 1990.

See also
 Women's FA Cup
 1989 European women's championship
 1988–89 FA Cup

References

Women's FA Cup seasons
Cup